Subdoluseps is a genus of skinks. They were all previously found in the genus Lygosoma.

Species
The following species are recognized as being valid.

Subdoluseps bowringii (Günther, 1864) – Christmas Island grass skink, Bowring's supple skink
Subdoluseps frontoparietalis (Taylor, 1962) – Taylor's writhing skink, pygmy supple skink
Subdoluseps herberti (M.A. Smith, 1916) – Herbert's supple skink
Subdoluseps malayana L. Grismer, Dzukafly, Muin, Quah, Karin, Anuar & Freitas, 2019 – Malaysian supple skink
Subdoluseps nilgiriensis Ganesh, Srikanthan, Ghosh, Adhikari, S. Kumar & Datta-Roy, 2021 – Nilgiri gracile skink 
Subdoluseps pruthi (Sharma, 1977) – Pruthi's skink
Subdoluseps samajaya (Karin, Freitas, Shonleben, L. Grismer, Bauer & Das, 2018)
Subdoluseps vietnamensis M.V. Le, V.D.H. Nguyen, Phan, Rujirawan, Aowphol, Vo, R. Murphy & S.N. Nguyen, 2021 – Vietnam agile skink

References

Subdoluseps
Lizard genera
Taxa named by Elyse S. Freitas
Taxa named by Aniruddha Datta-Roy
Taxa named by Larry Lee Grismer
Taxa named by Cameron D. Siler